The Nimbo Ka Nath Mahadev temple is located in the Pali district of Rajasthan. This temple is dedicated to Lord Shiva and attracts many devotees throughout the year. It is also known as the Nimbeshwar Mahadev Mandir. It is the center of great faith of Pali's people and Lord Shiva devotees in Pali. Located between Falna and Sanderao route, Nimbo Ka Nath is the same temple, which according to Hindu mythology, where Kunti, mother of the Pandavas, worshiped the Hindu deity Shiva during a period of exile. There are many carvings on the temple walls and it is a major part of the Pali city. The idol of Lord Shiva established inside the temple premises is a hand-crafted idol.

Fairs
Every year on the eve of Shivaratri and Baisakhi Purnima, fairs are organized which are attended by thousands of people around the city. The temple organizes fairs during special occasions and during this time the temple adorns a new look. Many people visit the temple during this fair and seek blessings from the deity.

References 

www.ranakpurtemple.com
Pali district web site

Shiva temples in Rajasthan
Pali district